Buena Vista Regional Medical Center (BVRMC), formerly Buena Vista County Hospital, is a 35-bed rural community critical access hospital located in Storm Lake, Iowa. BVRMC is an accredited facility with a more than 50-year history of improving the health of the people and the community it serves. BVRMC is a public hospital that has over 80 inpatient and outpatient services and 21 specialty clinics. They employ 400 individuals from 49 different communities.

Awards
 2015 Press Ganey Guardian of Excellence Award 
 2009 Best Places To Work Award- Modern Healthcare 
 2005 Press Ganey Compass Award for Outstanding Performance Improvement.
 Since 2007, 5 Hospital Hero Awards from the Iowa Hospital Association 
 Since 2006, 21 nurses awarded the honor of 100 Great Iowa Nurses

References

External links
 Official website
 City of Storm Lake

Hospital buildings completed in 1951
Hospitals in Iowa
Buildings and structures in Buena Vista County, Iowa
Storm Lake, Iowa